The Aero Synergie Papango (named for the New Zealand scaup, known in Māori as the papango) is a French ultralight aircraft that was produced by Sauper/ALMS and later by Aero Synergie. The aircraft was supplied as a kit for amateur construction and as a ready-to-fly complete aircraft. It is no longer in production as of 2012.

Design and development
The aircraft was designed to comply with the Fédération Aéronautique Internationale microlight rules. It features a strut-braced high-wing, a two seats in side-by-side configuration enclosed open cockpit, conventional landing gear and a single engine in tractor configuration.

The aircraft's  span wing employs a single strut per side. The standard engine available was the  Rotax 912 four-stroke powerplant. The Papango is noted for its good visibility and crew comfort.

Operational history
Designed for personal use the Papango has also found employment in flight training.

Specifications (Papango)

References

1990s French ultralight aircraft
Homebuilt aircraft
Single-engined tractor aircraft
Papango
High-wing aircraft